Jesse Owens Hickman (born February 18, 1939) is an American former professional baseball pitcher, who played in Major League Baseball (MLB) for the Kansas City Athletics (–). The ,  right-hander attended Louisiana Christian University.

After being selected by the Houston Colt .45s in the 1962 Expansion Draft, he played in the Houston (– Colts and 1965 Astros) minor league system.

Hickman was traded to the Athletics with a player to be named later (infielder Ernie Fazio) for slugging first baseman Jim Gentile, on June 4, 1965. The following night, Hickman made his Major League debut at home in relief against the Boston Red Sox. Although he pitched a scoreless tenth inning, Hickman surrendered a home run to Red Sox closer Dick Radatz in the eleventh frame and took the 5–3 loss, Hickman‘s only big league decision. The homer, Radatz' only MLB long ball, cleared the deep left-field fence at Municipal Stadium.

Hickman appeared in 12 more MLB games during 1965 and 1966, striking out 16 men in  innings pitched, but yielding ten earned runs, nine hits, and nine bases on balls. He retired from baseball after spending the  season in the California Angels’ minor league system.

References

External links

1939 births
Living people
Baseball players from Louisiana
Chattanooga Lookouts players
Des Moines Demons players
Durham Bulls players
El Paso Sun Kings players
Kansas City Athletics players
Louisiana Christian Wildcats baseball players
Major League Baseball pitchers
Oklahoma City 89ers players
People from Lecompte, Louisiana
San Antonio Bullets players
Seattle Angels players
Tampa Tarpons (1957–1987) players
Vancouver Mounties players